The General Biographical Dictionary is a book by British author John Gorton. The first edition was published in two volumes in 1828, with an appendix. A new edition that brought the work current as far as 1850 was published in four volumes in 1851. This edition featured a supplement by Cyrus Redding. It "is compiled from rather obvious sources of information". It "has an extended Life of Athanasius, well drawn up".

Reception
The book was one among several books of similar name that were available in the 19th century, and has remained in print since its first edition. It was one of the few books of its time to provide a comprehensive listing of biographies.

References
6 Spectator 1299
The Literary Gazette; and Journal of Belles Lettres, Arts, Sciences, &c. for the Year 1833. London. 1833.p 792
Ridout. Letters to a Young Governess. 1840. p 135
Ward. Men of the Reign. Routledge. 1885. p 47.

External links
hathitrust.org
openlibrary.org
ebooksread.com
forgottenbooks.org
onread.com
Google Books
Google Books

British biographical dictionaries